Sarah Lihan (born August 15, 1988) is an American sports sailor. She was born in Fort Lauderdale, Florida, United States.

At the 2012 Summer Olympics, she competed in the women's 470 class with Amanda Clark; the pair finished ninth.

References

1988 births
Living people
American female sailors (sport)
Olympic sailors of the United States
Sailors at the 2012 Summer Olympics – 470
Sportspeople from Fort Lauderdale, Florida
Lihan, Sarah
Yale Bulldogs sailors
21st-century American women